The New Government Degree College is a government-sponsored independent college located in Rajshahi, Bangladesh.

History 
This college was established in 1966. Since then it has been offering undergraduate programs and graduate programs under Bangladesh National University.

Academic results 
The college is one of the most advanced higher secondary educational institutes in Bangladesh. It is known for its very high results in H.S.C. (Higher Secondary Certificate) exams. In H.S.C. 2012, among the first top 10 colleges to attain highest G.P.A. of 5.00, it was the only college in Bangladesh outside. Besides this college remains in top hundred colleges every year all over Bangladesh in terms of hsc result. For instance 26th position all over Bangladesh in hsc 2020 result.  Dhaka.

Extra curriculum activities 
 Bangladesh National Cadet Corps
 Bangladesh Scouts
 Library, Indoor Games, Debating Clubs, Math Clubs, NLCC language club and so on.

Subject information 
The college offers courses in the following subject areas:

Arts Faculty:
 Bangla
 English
 Economics
 Arabic & Islamic Studies
 History
 Islamic History & Culture
 Philosophy
 Political Science

Business Faculty:
 Accounting
 Management
 Statistics

Science Faculty:
 Physics
 Chemistry
 Mathematics
 Botany
 Geography
 Zoology
 Information and Communication Technology

See also
 List of universities in Bangladesh
 Alokdia High School
 Madhupur Shahid Smrity Higher Secondary School
 Madhupur Rani Bhabani High School
 Madhupur College

References

External links
 

Colleges affiliated to National University, Bangladesh
Colleges in Rajshahi District
Universities and colleges in Rajshahi District
1966 establishments in East Pakistan
Schools in Rajshahi District